A creation myth (or creation story) is a cultural, religious or traditional myth which describes the earliest beginnings of the present world. Creation myths are the most common form of myth, usually developing first in oral traditions, and are found throughout human culture. A creation myth is usually regarded by those who subscribe to it as conveying profound truths, though not necessarily in a historical or literal sense. They are commonly, though not always, considered cosmogonical myths, that is, they describe the ordering of the cosmos from a state of chaos or amorphousness.

Basic type

Creation from chaos

Enûma Eliš (Babylonian creation myth)
Greek cosmogonical myth
Jamshid
Korean creation narratives
Kumulipo
Leviathan (Book of Job 38–41 creation myth)
Mandé creation myth
Pangu
Raven in Creation
Serer creation myth
Sumerian creation myth
Tungusic creation myth
Unkulunkulu
Väinämöinen
Viracocha

Earth diver

Ainu creation myth
Cherokee creation myth
Iroquois creation myth
Väinämöinen
Yoruba creation myth
Ob-Ugric creation myth

Emergence

Hopi creation myth
Maya creation of the world myth
Diné Bahaneʼ (Navajo)
Zuni creation myth

Ex nihilo (out of nothing)

Debate between sheep and grain
Barton cylinder
Ancient Egyptian creation myths
Genesis creation myth (Judaism, Christianity and Islam)
Kabezya-Mpungu
Māori myths
Mbombo
Ngai
Popol Vuh

World parent

Coatlicue
Enûma Eliš
Greek cosmogonical myth
Heliopolis creation myth
Hiranyagarbha creation myth
Kumulipo
Rangi and Papa
Völuspá

Divine twins

Proto-Indo-European creation myths

Regional

Africa
Ancient Egyptian creation myths
Fon creation myth
Kaang creation story (Bushmen)
Kintu myth (Bugandan)
Mandé creation myth
Mbombo (Kuba, Bakuba or Bushongo/Boshongo)
Ngai (Kamba, Kikuyu and Maasai )
Serer creation myth (cosmogony of the Serer people of Senegal, the Gambia and Mauritania)
Unkulunkulu (Zulu)
Yoruba creation

Americas
Caribbean

 Taíno creation myths

Mesoamerica 
Coatlicue (Aztec)
Maya creation of the world myth
Popol Vuh (Quiché Mayan)

Mid North America 
Anishinaabeg creation stories
Cherokee creation myth
Choctaw creation myth
Creek creation myth
Hopi creation myth
Kuterastan (Plains Apache)
Diné Bahaneʼ (Navajo)
Raven in Creation (Tlingit, Haida, and Tsimshian)
Zuni creation myth

South America
Legend of Trentren Vilu and Caicai Vilu (Chilean)
Viracocha (Incan)
Xolas (Chilean)

Asia

Central Asia
Ergenekon
Mongolian creation myth
Tungusic creation myth

East Asia
Ainu creation myth (Japan)
Au Co (Vietnamese)
Chinese creation myth
Japanese creation myth
Korean creation narratives
Nüwa (Chinese)
Pangu (Chinese)

Indian subcontinent
 Ajativada
 Buddhist cosmology
 Folk Hindu creation myth
 Hiranyagarbha creation (India)
 Jainism and non-creationism (India)
 Meitei mythology (India) 
 Mimamsa eternalism (India)
 Nyaya-Vaisheshika atomic theory (India)
 Samkhya-yoga theory (India)
 Sanamahi creation myth (India)

Europe
 Slavic creation myth
 Theogony (Classical Greco-Roman)
 Book of Invasions (Celtic, specifically Irish) 
 Väinämöinen (Finnish)
 Völuspá (Norse)

Middle East
 Debate between sheep and grain
 Enûma Eliš (Babylonian)
 Genesis creation myth (Hebrew)
 Islamic creation myth (Arabic)
 Leviathan (Book of Job 38-41 creation myth)
 Mashya and Mashyana (Persian)
 Sumerian creation myth

Pacific Islands/Oceanic
Areop-Enap (Nauruan)
Kumulipo (Hawaiian)
Māori myths (Māori)
Rangi and Papa (Māori)
Sureq Galigo (Buginese)

In mythopoeia 

In mythopoeia, an artificial mythology created by writers of prose or other fiction, traditional mythological themes and archetypes are integrated into fiction. Some works of mythopoeia also feature creation myths:
 Ainulindalë from Tolkien's The Silmarillion

References 
 
 

Creation